Glass Boys is the fourth full-length studio album from the Canadian hardcore punk band Fucked Up. It was released on June 3, 2014, by Matador Records. The album deals with themes of growing old in the punk scene while trying to stay true to one's youthful ideals.

Track listing

Personnel
 Damian Abraham – vocals
 Mike Haliechuk – guitar
 Josh Zucker – guitar
 Ben Cook – guitar
 Sandy Miranda – bass
 Jonah Falco – drums

Charts

References

2014 albums
Fucked Up albums
Matador Records albums